Mantis is a fictional supervillain appearing in comic books published by DC Comics, part of Jack Kirby's New Gods series.

Publication history
Mantis first appeared in Forever People #2 (June 1971) and was created by writer-artist Jack Kirby.

Fictional character biography
Mantis is the leader of a colony of humanoid insects that migrated from New Genesis. In return for his fealty, Darkseid gave him great power. He typically spent time in a power pod recharging his energies but he could also absorb energies sent at him by an opponent such as Green Lantern. Mantis has at times served as Darkseid's lackey and, like many of the denizens of Apokolips, has occasionally risen up against his master.

Mantis assists Darkseid in creating the first Secret Society of Super-Villains.

Mantis is featured in issue #5 of the limited series Death of the New Gods. He partners with Darkseid's son Kalibak after the murders of many "Fourth Age" gods. While in "Supertown", the duo battles Superman, Himon and the New Gods military leader "The General". During the battle, the Infinity-Man, acting as an agent for the Source Wall, attacks. He stuns the group and kills Mantis and Kalibak by removing their hearts.

Powers and abilities
Mantis is the second most powerful being on Apokolips, second to only Darkseid himself. Mantis is an energy vampire who can project tremendous blasts of energy and absorb virtually any form of energy or power source, including a power ring and the powers of a super being (as he did against the Martian Manhunter). He can even absorb magic, and can turn any energy against an opponent. He cannot, however, absorb Captain Atom's powers of radiation. Mantis can also teleport, open up his own boom tubes and he can charge matter with energy. Mantis' energy powers grant him with the ability to sense and detect energy, enabling him to even sense an opponent who is invisible. He can even strike beings who are intangible with his energy blasts.

Mantis possesses a "thermal touch" which enables him to generate heat and he can create "frigi-blocks" which trap opponents in ice. Mantis' most dangerous power is his ability to generate antimatter. He can destroy anything he touches by creating antimatter in the object that he touched. Mantis can generate and build large amounts of cosmic energy through his power pod which he keeps underground and heavily guarded. If he uses up too much energy in a battle or becomes heavily injured, then he will flee to his power pod to recharge.

Alongside his vast energy-manipulating abilities, Mantis also possesses vast super strength, durability and stamina. He also possesses super speed, agility and reflexes, flight, and like all denizens of the Fourth World, is immortal.

In other media

Television
 Mantis appears in the Justice League Unlimited episode "Question Authority", voiced by an uncredited J.K. Simmons. He battles Superman and Captain Atom while fleeing the civil war on Apokolips before being returned to Apokolips. Mantis later appears in a cameo in "Alive!", taking part in the civil war on Apokolips and bowing before the return of Darkseid.
 Mantis appears in Batman: The Brave and the Bold, voiced by Wade Williams. He first appears in the teaser of the episode "Cry Freedom Fighters!", attacking a cul-de-sac and fighting Stargirl. She used her staff to create her own Bat-Signal to summon Batman only to end up getting Blue Beetle. It took the combined efforts of Stargirl and Blue Beetle to overload Mantis with their energy attacks. In "Darkseid Descending!", Mantis participates in Darkseid's plans to invade Earth.
 Mantis appears in the Young Justice: Outsiders episode "Away Mission", voiced by Andrew Kishino. This version has four arms, is much bulkier, and can roll around like a boulder. While Mantis is a sapient humanoid insect, he is not a New God (although he comes from New Genesis). Mantis is the leader of the Bugs and has an intense hatred for New Gods. When Ma'alefa'ak tries manipulating the Bugs into starting a war with the New Gods, Mantis is gradually consumed in his hatred. As a result, even after the New Gods and their allies from the Team prove that Ma'alefa'ak was the only real enemy, and meaning they can all be trusted, Mantis banishes them and all other Outsiders from his territory, as well as Forager from the hive when he stops him from attacking Wonder Girl and Blue Beetle. He later abandoned his hive to serve the New Gods of Apokolips. In the episode "Into the Breach", Mantis and the Female Furies are defeated by the Outsiders and arrested by the Justice League. In Phantoms, Darkseid has placed Mantis on a team with Lor-Zod and Ma’alefa’ak to steal a Phantom Zone projector. Mantis manages to find the projector in Metron’s vault while his team was incapacitated.

Film
An alternative universe version of Mantis appears in Justice League: Gods and Monsters.

Video games
Mantis appears as a playable character in Lego DC Super-Villains, voiced by Lex Lang. He is the boss of the second bonus level "From Man to Mantis", where after Cyborg and The Flash escape from the chains trapping them in the energy mine in Apokolips, Mantis tries to fight the two to stop them from escaping and rescuing Superman, but gets defeated by the two heroes, and they escape.

References

External links
 Spider-Bob's Comic Book Encyclopedia
 Mantis at the DC Database

Comics characters introduced in 1971
DC Comics aliens
DC Comics deities
DC Comics demons
DC Comics extraterrestrial supervillains
DC Comics supervillains
New Gods of Apokolips
DC Comics characters with superhuman strength
DC Comics characters who can move at superhuman speeds 
DC Comics characters who can teleport 
Characters created by Jack Kirby